The 2015 Alabama State Hornets football team represented Alabama State University as a member of the East Division of the Southwestern Athletic Conference (SWAC) during 2015 NCAA Division I FCS football season. Led by first-year head coach Brian Jenkins, the Hornets compiled an overall record of 6–5 with a mark of 5–4 in conference play, placing second in the SWAC East Division. Alabama State played home games at New ASU Stadium in Montgomery, Alabama.

Schedule

References

Alabama State
Alabama State Hornets football seasons
Alabama State Hornets football